This page lists diplomatic missions located in Wales, a constituent country within the United Kingdom.

Consulate General, Consulates and representative offices

Cardiff
 (Consulate)
 (Consulate General)
 (Consulate)

See also
 Foreign relations of the United Kingdom
 List of diplomatic missions of the United Kingdom
 Hong Kong Economic and Trade Office, London

References
London Diplomatic List
Consular Representatives in the UK

 
Wales
United Kingdom
Diplomatic
Diplomatic missions